Padrauna is a constituency of the Uttar Pradesh Legislative Assembly covering the city of Padrauna in the Kushinagar district of Uttar Pradesh, India.

Padrauna is one of five assembly constituencies in the Kushi Nagar Lok Sabha constituency. Since 2008, this assembly constituency is numbered 330 amongst 403 constituencies.

Election results

2022

2017
Bharatiya Janta Party candidate Swami Prasad Maurya won in last Assembly election of 2017 Uttar Pradesh Legislative Elections defeating Bahujan Samaj Party candidate Javed Iqbal by a margin of 40,552 votes.

Members of Legislative Assembly

See also

 Padrauna
 Kushinagar district
 Kushi Nagar Lok Sabha constituency

References

External links
 

Assembly constituencies of Uttar Pradesh
Padrauna